The Northern Constabulary was the territorial police force responsible for Northern Scotland, covering the Highland council area along with the Western Isles, the Orkney Islands and the Shetland Islands, which make up most of the Highlands and Islands area.  It was the police force covering the largest geographical area in the United Kingdom, equivalent to the size of Belgium, but was one of the smallest in terms of officers, with about 715 officers.  The Constabulary was one of those amalgamated to form Police Scotland in 2013.

History
This police force was formed on 16 May 1975 as a merger of the pre-existing Northern Constabulary, the Ross and Sutherland Constabulary (itself a merger of Ross and Cromarty Constabulary and Sutherland Constabulary) and the Inverness Constabulary (a merger of Inverness Burgh Police and Inverness-shire Constabulary), along with the northernmost portion of the Argyll County Police area, and the Nairn part of the Scottish North East Counties Constabulary.  The previous Northern Constabulary had been created in 1969 by the merger of the Caithness Constabulary, Orkney Constabulary and Zetland Constabulary.

The new Northern Constabulary was created at the same time as local government reorganisation created the Highland regional council and the islands councils of the Western Isles, Orkney and Shetland. The rest of the Argyll County Police was merged into the Strathclyde Police, and the rest of the Scottish North East Counties Constabulary into the Grampian Police.

The Northern Constabulary area was the same as that covered by the Highlands and Islands Fire and Rescue Service.

To help keep decision-making as local as possible, Northern was at the forefront nationally in Devolved Resource Management (DRM) for many years. The Chief Constable allocated one-line budgets to each of his Area Commanders, closely monitoring progress across a range of indicators, over the year, through regular Performance Review and Performance Review Boards.

An Act of the Scottish Parliament, the Police and Fire Reform (Scotland) Act 2012, created a single Police Service of Scotland - known as Police Scotland - with effect from 1 April 2013. This merged the eight regional police forces in Scotland (including Northern Constabulary), together with the Scottish Crime and Drug Enforcement Agency, into a single service covering the whole of Scotland. Police Scotland has its headquarters at the Scottish Police College at Tulliallan in Fife.

Divisions and Area Commands

Northern Constabulary was split into three Divisions: North, Central and East. In these three Divisions there were eight Area Commands, each with their own Area Commander. The Area Commands were:

Caithness Sutherland & East Ross
Orkney
Shetland
Ross & Cromarty
Lochaber, Skye & Lochalsh
Western Isles
Inverness
Badenoch, Strathspey & Nairn

Uniform
Until the early 21st century, the uniform consisted of a white shirt, black tie and a stab-proof vest. Northern Constabulary was the last police force in Scotland using shirts and ties. In 2009, the uniform changed to become similar to that of other police forces of Scotland: black shirt with force logo, stab-proof vest and black trousers.

Chief Constables
Chief constables were: 
1975–1985 : Donald Burnie Henderson
1985–1996 : Hugh MacMillan
1996–2001 : William Robertson
2001–2011 : Ian Latimer
2011–2013 : George Graham

See also 
 List of defunct law enforcement agencies in the United Kingdom

References

External links 
Official Northern Constabulary website
 Official Police Scotland Highlands and Islands website

Defunct police forces of Scotland
Highland (council area)
Outer Hebrides
Orkney
Organisations associated with Shetland
1975 establishments in Scotland
Government agencies established in 1975
2013 disestablishments in Scotland
Government agencies disestablished in 2013
Organisations based in Inverness